James Moore (born 26 February 1978 in Arklow, County Wicklow, Ireland), is a professional boxer.  Moore currently fights in the Light Middleweight division although he fought as a welterweight during his amateur career.

Amateur titles
Moore boxed as an amateur for  Ireland and won three national senior titles and a bronze medal at the 2001 World Amateur Boxing Championships.

Professional career
Moore turned professional in August 2005, winning his first fight at the Manhattan Center, New York, NY, USA, in which Moore knocked out fellow debutant Gabrial Garcia on an undercard that included Jaidon Codrington and Patrick Nwamu.

Although a native Wicklowman, Moore, like his fellow Irishman John Duddy emigrated to America and fights out of Gleasons Gym in New York. Moore has fought regularly  since debut and is currently ranked 3rd in Irish.boxing.com's rankings of light middleweights.

References

External links
 
Interview with James Moore

People from Arklow
Sportspeople from County Wicklow
1978 births
Living people
Irish male boxers
AIBA World Boxing Championships medalists
Middleweight boxers